Hildegard Falck (née Janze on 8 June 1949) is a retired West German runner. At the 1972 Olympics she won a gold medal in the 800 m and a bronze medal in the 4 × 400 m relay with West German team. In the 800 m final she finished 0.1 seconds ahead of Nijolė Sabaitė and Gunhild Hoffmeister.

On 11 July 1971 Falck ran the 800 m in 1:58.5 minutes in Stuttgart, improving the world record of Vera Nikolic by two seconds. She was the first woman to clock a time under two minutes if the unratified marks of Sin Kim Dan are discounted. Her record stood until 1973.

Before turning to athletics, Falck studied to become a secondary school teacher and trained in handball and swimming. In 1971, besides her 800 m world record, she won a gold medal in the 800 m at the European Indoor Championships and a silver in the 4 × 400 m relay at European Championships; she also helped Ellen Tittel, Sylvia Schenk and Christa Merten to break the 4 × 800 m world record.

Domestically she won the 800 m titles in 1970 and 1971 (both indoor and outdoor), and in 1973 outdoor. In 1972, she was awarded the Silver Bay Leaf of the German Track & Field Association.

Falck was coached by her husband Rolf Falck. They later divorced, and she married Dr. Klaus Kimmich, a pentathlete with whom she had two children.

References

1949 births
Living people
People from Hameln-Pyrmont
Sportspeople from Lower Saxony
West German female middle-distance runners
German national athletics champions
Athletes (track and field) at the 1972 Summer Olympics
Olympic athletes of West Germany
Olympic bronze medalists for West Germany
Olympic gold medalists for West Germany
World record setters in athletics (track and field)

European Athletics Championships medalists
Medalists at the 1972 Summer Olympics
Olympic gold medalists in athletics (track and field)
Olympic bronze medalists in athletics (track and field)